The men's C-2 1000 metres event was an open-style, pairs canoeing event conducted as part of the Canoeing at the 1968 Summer Olympics program. In the official report, heat times were shown in tenths of a second (0.1) while semifinal and final events were shown in hundredths of a second (0.01).

Medalists

Results

Heats
The 13 teams first raced in two heats on October 22. One team was disqualified during the heats. The top three finishers from each of the heats advanced directly to the final and the remaining six teams were relegated to the semifinal.

Canada was in fifth place halfway through the 2nd heat, but was disqualified in the official report for reasons not disclosed.

Semifinal
The top three finishers in the semifinal (raced on October 24) advanced to the final.

Final
The final was held on October 25.

Czechoslovakia was sixth at the halfway mark in the official report, but was disqualified for reasons not disclosed.

References
1968 Summer Olympics official report Volume 3, Part 2. p. 619. 
Sports-reference.com 1968 C-2 1000 m results.

Men's C-2 1000
Men's events at the 1968 Summer Olympics